Aviron Bayonnais, commonly called Bayonne, is a French rugby union club from Bayonne (Baiona, in Basque) in Pyrénées-Atlantiques which, for the 2016-17 season, competed in the top tier of the French league system, in the Top 14 competition. In the 2015–16 Rugby Pro D2 Season they were promoted after finishing 2nd and winning the playoff final against Aurillac. In the 2016-2017 season, they finished in last place, and will be relegated back to Pro D2 for the 2017-18 season.
Founded in 1904, they play at the Parc des Sports also known as Stade Jean-Dauger in Bayonne. 
Their mascot is a pottok pony called pottoka. They have ties to the French Basque community.

History
The club was established in 1904, making their first final appearance in the 1913 season, where they defeated S.C.U.F. 31-8 at the Stade Yves-du-Manoir. The national domestic championship was replaced by the Coupe de l'Espérance during World War I. The competition was played for four seasons, with Aviron Bayonnais contesting the last final, which they lost to Stadoceste Tarbais 4 to 3.

With the French championship resumed, the club made their next championship game in the 1922 season where they met Toulouse. Aviron Bayonnais lost the final 6 to nil. The two clubs would meet again the next season to again contest the championship final, which Toulouse won again, 3 to nil.

Aviron Bayonnais enjoyed success during the mid-1930s, defeating Biarritz 13 to 8 in Toulouse to win their second championship, and first since 1913. They also won the Challenge Yves du Manoir in 1936, defeating Perpignan in the final. The club saw similar results during the mid-1940s as well, with two championship final appearances; defeating SU Agen in the 1943 final at Parc des Princes in Paris and losing the 1944 season final to Perpignan.

Since the 1940s the club did not find a lot of success over the coming years, as they would have to wait until the 1980s until they would again reach any of the championship finals. In 1980 they contested the final of the Challenge Yves du Manoir, defeating AS Béziers 16 to 10 to gain their second title of that competition. They made it to the final of the 1982 season, although they were defeated by SU Agen, 18 to 9.

Aviron Bayonnais was relegated to the Group A2 in 1996, where it spent eight seasons. The team was promoted to the Top 16/14 in 2004, remaining there for 11 consecutive seasons. The team was relegated to the Pro D2 in 2015, and has been a yo-yo club since then.

Honours
 French championship:
 Champions: 1913, 1934 and 1943
 Finalist: 1922, 1923, 1944 and 1982
 Challenge Yves du Manoir:
 Champions: 1936 and 1980
 Coupe de l'Espérance:
 Finalist: 1919
 Coupe André Moga:
 Champions: 1995
 Pro D2
 Champions: 2019, 2022
 Euro Basque Rugby Challenge
 Champions: 2019

Finals results

French championship

Challenge Yves du Manoir

Coupe de l'Espérance

Current standings

Current squad

The Bayonne squad for the 2022–23 season is:

Espoirs squad

Notable former players 

 Lisandro Arbizu 
 Martín Bustos Moyano
 Matías Cortese
 Nicolás Fernández Miranda
 Santiago Fernández
 José María Núñez Piossek
 Juan Pablo Orlandi
 Rodney Blake
 Mark Chisholm
 Cameron Treloar
 Ramón Ayarza
 Phil Davies
 Filimoni Bolavucu
 Gabiriele Lovobalavu
 Savenaca Rawaca
 Metuisela Talebula
 Saïmoni Vaka
 André Alvarez 
 Clément Ancely
 Grégory Arganese
 Yoan Audrin
 Julien Audy
 Denis Avril
 Marc Baget
 Antoine Battut
 Robert Baulon 
 André Béhotéguy 
 Henri Béhotéguy 
 Christian Belascain 
 Eugène Billac
 Benjamin Boyet  
 Renaud Boyoud 
 Maurice Celhay
 Baptiste Chouzenoux
 Jean Condom
 Jean Dauger
 Walter Desmaison
 Pierre Dospital 
 Richard Dourthe
 Bernard Duprat
 Pépito Elhorga
 Jean-Pierre Élissalde
 Anthony Étrillard
 Benjamin Fall
 Fernand Forgues
 Xavier Garbajosa
 Pierre Gayraud
 Jean-Michel Gonzalez
 Steven Hall
 Arnaud Héguy
 Cédric Heymans
 Yoann Huget
 Aretz Iguiniz
 Vincent Inigo
 Jean Iraçabal 
 Louis Junquas 
 Paul Labadie
 Simon Labouyrie
 Thibault Lacroix
 Patrice Lagisquet
 Damien Lagrange
 Daniel Larrechea
 Grégoire Lascubé
 René Lasserre
 Christophe Lamaison
 Christian Magnanou 
 Jean-Jo Marmouyet
 Romain Martial
 Rémy Martin
 Lionel Mazars
 Yannick N'Gog
 Marvin O'Connor
 Charles Ollivon
 Clément Otazo
 Laurent Pardo
 Patrick Perrier 
 Jean-Baptiste Peyras-Loustalet
 Roland Pétrissans 
 Lucas Pointud
 Julien Puricelli
 Jérôme Schuster
 Scott Spedding
 Jacques Rollet
 David Roumieu
 Benjamin Thiéry
 Matthieu Ugalde
 Jean-Marie Usandisaga
 Giorgi Jgenti
 Davit Khinchaguishvili
 Avto Kopaliani
 Lorenzo Cittadini
 Craig Gower
 Salvatore Perugini
 Ramiro Pez
 Wataru Murata
 P. J. van Lill
 Stephen Brett 
 Tom Donnelly
 Ross Filipo
 Troy Flavell
 Gerard Fraser
 Dwayne Haare
 Tanerau Latimer
 Sione Lauaki
 Joe Rokocoko
 Blair Stewart
 Neemia Tialata
 Willie du Plessis
 Sam Gerber
 JC Janse van Rensburg
 Rassie Jansen van Vuuren
 Joe Pietersen
 Viacheslav Grachev
 Census Johnston
 Leo Lafaiali'i
 Jeremy Tomuli
 Johnnie Beattie
 James McLaren
 Oscar Astarloa
 Cédric Garcia
 Francisco Puertas Soto
 Manu Ahotaeiloa
 Lisiate Faʻaoso
 Pila Fifita
 Opeti Fonua
 Ben Broster
 Mike Phillips

Coaches
 Janu.2010-2010 :  Christian Gajan
 2010-Dec.2011 :  Christian Gajan,  Thomas Lièvremont 
 Dec.2011-Janu.2012 :  Jean-Pierre Elissalde, Didier Faugeron,  Pierre-Henry Broncan. 
 Janu.2012-June 2012 :  Didier Faugeron,  Denis Avril.
 2012-2013 :  Christian Lanta,  Christophe Deylaud,  Denis Avril.
2013-2014 :  Christian Lanta,  Christophe Deylaud
 2014-2015 :  Patricio Noriega
2015–2017 :  Vincent Etcheto
2017–present :  Pierre Berbizier

See also
 List of rugby union clubs in France
 Rugby union in France

Further reading

References

External links
  Aviron Bayonnais Official website
  Club information

Aviron Bayonnais
Bayonne
Rugby clubs established in 1904
Organizations based in Northern Basque Country
1904 establishments in France